Cistus heterophyllus is a shrubby species of flowering plant in the family Cistaceae.

Description
The leaf margins are slightly turned under (revolute) and the veins are much more obvious on the underside. The leaves are of two kinds: the upper are without stalks (petioles), the lower have short stalks. The flowers are arranged in cymes of one to five individual flowers, each with five purplish-pink petals, usually with a yellow spot at the base. Like the leaves, the five sepals have stellate hairs, plus some longer simple hairs.

The two described subspecies differ in the distribution of hairs. In C. h. subsp. heterophyllus, the young stems have both many stellate hairs and many longer simple hairs, and the leaves have scattered long simple hairs. In C. h. subsp. carthaginensis, the young stems and leaves have fewer simple hairs.

Taxonomy and phylogeny

Cistus heterophyllus was first described by René Louiche Desfontaines in 1798. The specific epithet heterophyllus means "with leaves of different shapes", the upper being unstalked, the lower shortly stalked.

Two subspecies are accepted:
 Cistus heterophyllus subsp. carthaginensis (Pau) M.B.Crespo & Mateo – mainland Spain
 Cistus heterophyllus subsp. heterophyllus – north Africa

The two subspecies have been artificially crossed forming a hybrid subspecies called C. h. nothosubsp. marzoi.

A 2011 molecular phylogenetic study placed C. heterophyllus in the purple and pink flowered clade (PPC) of Cistus species, in a subclade with C. albidus and C. creticus.

Distribution
Cistus heterophyllus has a disjoint distribution. C. h. subsp. heterophyllus is native to western North Africa, along the coastal Mediterranean region from the Spanish island of Peñón de Alhucemas and Targuist in Morocco to Algiers. C. h. subsp. carthaginensis is found only in two locations in mainland Spain: near La Pobla de Vallbona in Valencia and in the Calblanque Regional Park in Murcia.

Conservation
Cistus heterophyllus subsp. carthaginensis is listed as critically endangered (CR) in the IUCN Red List. Fewer than 30 individuals were known in 2011 (only one at the Valencian site) and some appear to be hybrids with Cistus albidus. The subspecies is threatened by fires and human disturbance. Seeds have been stored in seedbanks, and attempts are being made to increase plants in cultivation, both from seed and in vitro.

References

External links

 

heterophyllus